The 2015 Football Federation South Australia season was the 109th season of soccer in South Australia, and the third under the National Premier Leagues format.

League tables

2015 National Premier Leagues SA

The National Premier League South Australia 2015 season was played over 26 rounds, from February to August 2015.

League Table

Results

Leading Goalscorers

Finals

Promotion/relegation play-off

2015 NPL State League

The 2015 NPL State League was the third edition of the new NPL State League as the second level domestic association football competition in South Australia (and third level within Australia overall). 16 teams competed, all playing each other twice for a total of 30 rounds, with the league and playoff winners at the end of the year promoted to the 2016 National Premier Leagues South Australia.

Results

Leading Goalscorers
Correct as of conclusion of Round 30

2015 SA Regional Leagues

2015 Women's Premier League

This was the last season of the Premier League format before the introduction of the NPL. The 9 teams played a double round-robin for a total of 16 games.

Cup Competitions

2015 Federation Cup

South Australian soccer clubs competed in 2015 for the Federation Cup. Clubs entered from the NPL SA, the State League 1 and State League 2. 

This knockout competition was won by Croydon Kings. 

The competition also served as the South Australian Preliminary Rounds for the 2015 FFA Cup. In addition to the Croydon Kings, North Eastern MetroStars (as the 2014 National Premier Leagues Champion), and the A-League club Adelaide United qualified for the final rounds, entering at the Round of 32.

References

External links
 Official website
 Youtube Account
 League Tables

2015 in Australian soccer
Football South Australia seasons